Fergi Series was a short-lived live-action educational series originally produced in the 1970s by Walt Disney Productions' educational media division. The series dealt with businesses of prototypes, production, capital, outlay and merchandising. This series also introduced good business vocabulary and clear step-by-step demonstration of the enterprise system at work. Richard Kuller played the title character. At the time of release it was considered a new way of economical teaching.

Films

1975
If The Fergi Fits, Wear It
Fergi Diversifies

1977
Fergi Goes Inc.

1978
Fergi Meets The Challenge

References

Disney educational films
Disney short film series
1970s educational films